Osvald Johansson (7 October 1932 – 20 February 1975) was a Swedish cyclist. He competed in the individual road race and team time trial events at the 1960 Summer Olympics.

References

External links
 

1932 births
1975 deaths
Swedish male cyclists
Olympic cyclists of Sweden
Cyclists at the 1960 Summer Olympics
Sportspeople from Uppsala
20th-century Swedish people